Chlorocalcite is a rare potassium calcium chloride evaporite mineral with formula: KCaCl3. It is found in active volcanic fumaroles.

It was first described in 1872 for an occurrence on Mount Vesuvius and given the name for its calcium content previous to discovering that it also contained potassium. It has also been reported from the Desdemona Mine, Peine, Lower Saxony, Germany.

References

Sodium minerals
Calcium minerals
Halide minerals
Orthorhombic minerals
Minerals in space group 62
Mount Vesuvius